Barbadian singer Rihanna has embarked on  twelve concert tours, five of which have been worldwide. Her 2006 debut, Rihanna: Live in Concert Tour was based in North America only and supported her first and second studio album, Music of the Sun (2005) and A Girl like Me (2006). The tour lasted for three months, through which Rihanna performed 36 shows. The same year, Rihanna continued to tour as a special guest on the PCD World Tour with Pussycat Dolls, Roc the Block Tour with Jay-Z and Ne-Yo, and the Monkey Business Tour with Black Eyed Peas. In the period from 2007 till 2009, she performed on the worldwide Good Girl Gone Bad Tour in a support of her third studio album with same name. During the tour, Rihanna visited Europe, North America, Oceania, Asia and Africa. It featured Rihanna presenting completely different style and wearing leather outfits. The Good Girl Gone Bad Tour sparked controversy in Malaysia where the Pan-Malaysian Islamic Party recommended that Rihanna's concert tour should be banned due her provocative outfits. A DVD, titled Good Girl Gone Bad Live was released on June 16, 2008. It features the show from Evening News Arena in Manchester, England, held on December 6, 2007.

In 2010 and 2011, Rihanna embarked on her second worldwide Last Girl on Earth Tour to further promote her fourth studio album Rated R (2009). During the tour, Rihanna performed 67 shows and visited Europe, North America, Asia and Australia. Simon Henwood was a creative director of the tour with its theme being Rihanna's dreams and nightmares featuring her as the last human alive. During the tour, Extreme's guitarist, Nuno Bettencourt, joined Rihanna's band. Last Girl on Earth Tour featured several opening acts, including American singers Kesha and Travie McCoy for the North American leg of the tour, Pixie Lott for the UK shows, while Scottish DJ Calvin Harris opened the shows from the Australian leg. The tour received predominantly positive reviews from critics, with Daily Telegraph's Neil McCormick praising its costumes, dance-routines and screens.

In late 2010, Rihanna released her fifth studio album, Loud. To further promote its material, Rihanna embarked on her fourth concert tour, the Loud Tour, in June 2011, having announced it on February 9, 2011. The tour comprised 98 show dates, 33 in North America, 4 in South America and 61 in Europe. The concert's stage featured separate sections where the audience had the chance to be in the show. Originally, J. Cole and Cee Lo Green were planned as support acts for the North American leg. However, Green left the tour citing schedule conflicts. Calvin Harris was featured as an opening act on the European leg of the tour. The tour was received positively by critics, who praised Rihanna's vocals and dance-moves. It featured Rihanna giving a lap dance to fan that she chose from the audience, during the performance of "Skin". According to Pollstar the tour grossed $90 million worldwide and became the 7th highest-grossing tour of 2011. In 2008, Rihanna also performed a series of charity concerts titled A Girl's Night Out, to benefit the "Believe Foundation". Rihanna's fifth concert tour, Diamonds World Tour was in support of her seventh studio album Unapologetic and became Rihanna's highest-grossing tour, surpassing her Loud tour in 2011. It comprised 96 show dates and visited North America, Africa, Europe and Oceania. Rihanna also embarked on a co-headlining mini-tour with Eminem in 2014. Rihanna's most recent concert-tour supported by Travis Scott- Anti World Tour was held throughout 2016 in support of her eighth studio album Anti.

Concert tours

Co-headlining concert tours

Promotional tours

Featured act

Live televised performances

References

External links
 Rihannas's official website

Rihanna